A folding wing is a wing configuration design feature of aircraft to save space and is typical of carrier-based aircraft that operate from the limited deck space of aircraft carriers. The folding allows the aircraft to occupy less space in a confined hangar because the folded wing normally rises over the fuselage decreasing the floor area of the aircraft. Vertical clearance is also limited in aircraft carrier hangar decks. In order to accommodate for this, some aircraft such as the Supermarine Seafire and Fairey Gannet have additional hinges to fold the wingtips downward, while others such as the S-3 Viking have folding tails. The F-14 Tomcat's variable-sweep wings could be "overswept" to occupy less space.

History

Short Brothers, the world's first aircraft manufacturer, developed and patented folding wing mechanisms for biplane ship-borne aircraft like their Short Folder, the first patent being granted in 1913. The Folder's biplane wings were hinged so that they folded back horizontally alongside the fuselage, usually being held in place by latches projecting sideways from the rear of the fuselage.

The Douglas TBD Devastator was the first naval aircraft to feature hydraulic folding wings.

Description
Since the monoplane supplanted the biplane in the late 1930s, virtually all fixed-wing aircraft designed for shipboard duty have been equipped with folding wings. Notable exceptions include the SBD Dauntless, F2A Buffalo, and A4D/A-4 Skyhawk (all USN types); the Mitsubishi A5M and Yokosuka D4Y (Japanese); and the Sea Harrier (British). All six are relatively compact designs. Exceptions which are currently in use, as of 2021, include the Dassault Rafale, the Lockheed Martin F-35B, and the McDonnell Douglas AV-8B Harrier.

The Grumman-patented Sto-Wing aftwards-folding wing folding system, pioneered on the Grumman F4F-4 Wildcat, has been used since World War II on a number of Grumman-designed carrier aircraft, a version of which is still in use in the 21st century on the Grumman E-2 Hawkeye shipboard airborne early warning (AEW) aircraft and its C-2 Greyhound derivative.

Another Grumman naval aircraft, the F-14 Tomcat, had variable-sweep wings that could be swept between 20° and 68° in flight. For parking, the wings could be "overswept" to 75°.

A folding wing has some disadvantages compared to a non-folding wing. It is heavier and has more complex connections for electrical, fuel, aerodynamic, and structural systems.

Many naval helicopters have rotor blades that can be aligned over the fuselage to save space on board ships.

Folding surfaces are rare among land-based designs and are used on aircraft that are too tall or too wide to fit inside service hangars. Examples include the Boeing B-50 Superfortress and its folding tail. The Saab 37 Viggen and the Boeing 377 Stratocruiser have foldable rear fins that make them lower for entering hangars. The Boeing 777 (classic) twinjet wide-body airliner was offered with folding wingtips for confined airports. The new Boeing 777X models feature a shorter and simpler folding wingtip than was planned for the earlier Boeing 777. This will provide an extra  of total wingspan in flight, yet the plane will still fit inside the same airport gates as the 777-200LR/777-300ER.

Gallery

Simple fold

Aftward fold

Double fold

Rotating wing

Over-swept wings

Folding-wing aircraft on flight deck

Notes

Bibliography

External links

 The Case for the Folding Wing – Flying

Naval aviation technology
Aircraft wing components